The North Kenwood District is a historic district within the Kenwood community area of South Side, Chicago, Illinois.

Description
It includes the 4500-block of South Berkeley, as well as surrounding historic structures in an area bounded by 43rd Street, 47th Street, Cottage Grove, and the Illinois Central Railroad tracks.

The Kenwood Evangelical Church, which is listed on the National Register of Historic Places is in this neighborhood.

The area was designated a Chicago Landmark district on June 9, 1993.

See also
 Kenwood District
 National Register of Historic Places listings in Chicago, Illinois

References

Historic districts in Chicago
South Side, Chicago
Chicago Landmarks